The San Juan massacre is the name given to an attack by the Bolivian military on miners of the Siglo XX-Catavi tin mining complex in Bolivia. The attack occurred on 24 June 1967, in the early hours of the traditional festival of the Night of San Juan which is a winter solstice festival in the Southern Hemisphere. The army was acting under the orders of President René Barrientos.

Background
President René Barrientos believed that the start of a new guerrilla resistance to his dictatorship was brewing among the mining communities, inspired by Che Guevara's small force which were operating in Bolivia at the time. The ambush was planned to crush any attempt to organise resistance among the miners. The miners union the FSTMB had called for an enlarged national meeting for the day after the Night of San Juan in the miner's settlement of Llallagua XX. Footage from a British Pathé newsreel showed there was indeed tension in the area, with miners even starting a strike. On 17 June 1967, The New York Times reported that miners in area were threatening to strike.

The massacre

The assembled miners and families celebrated the festival of the longest night of 23 to 24 June with bonfires, firecrackers and dynamite as well as traditional foods and beverages, not knowing that units of the elite Rangers and Camacho regiments of Oruro had already surrounded them. At around 5 in the morning the soldiers poured out of the train carriages and descended on the assembled mass, attacking with machine guns and dynamite. The electricity had been cut shortly before the attack, so the local radio station La Voz del Minero (the Voice of the Miner) was unable to warn the miners or spread the news to the outside world. The soldiers shot men, women, and children at close range. Many of the miners and families were either asleep or intoxicated after the all night festivities and the sound of the initial shots and explosions were confused with the traditional firecrackers of the celebration.

The bulk of the victims were in the encampment called La Salvadora around the Cancañiri railway station.

Under the conditions of dictatorship, media reporting of the massacre was severely limited and no official investigation followed.

La Patria newspaper reported that:

Initial estimates of casualties were of 20 dead and 72 wounded.

References in historiography and literature
The massacre was witnessed by the writer Victor Montoya at the age of 9.

Notes

See also
Other massacres in the same location
 Catavi massacre, 1942
 , 1996

San Juan
Human rights abuses in Bolivia
Political repression in Bolivia
1967 in Bolivia
June 1967 events in South America